Nick Smidt (born 12 May 1997 in Assen) is a Dutch athlete specialising in the 400 metres hurdles. He won a silver medal at the 2019 European U23 Championships.

His personal best in the event is 49.28 seconds set in Zürich in 2019.

International competitions

References

1997 births
Living people
Dutch male hurdlers
World Athletics Championships athletes for the Netherlands
People from Assen
Dutch Athletics Championships winners
Athletes (track and field) at the 2020 Summer Olympics
Olympic athletes of the Netherlands
World Athletics Indoor Championships medalists
Sportspeople from Drenthe
21st-century Dutch people